The 2022–23 Algerian Cup is the 56th edition of the Algerian Cup. It returns after two years of break due to COVID-19 pandemic. It is sponsored by Mobilis and known as the Mobilis Algerian Cup for sponsorship purposes. The winners will qualify to the 2023–24 CAF Confederation Cup. CR Belouizdad are the defending champions.

Teams

National rounds

Round of 64 
The draw was made on 15 November 2022.

Round of 32 
The new schedule was made on 1 December 2022.

References

External links 

Algerian Cup
Algerian Cup
Algeria